Anthony J. Cavallo was an American football player and coach.  He served as the head football coach at New Mexico College of Agriculture and Mechanic Arts—now known as New Mexico State University—from 1955 to 1957, compiling a record of 7–23.  A native of Weymouth, Massachusetts, Cavallo played college football as a halfback at Lafayette College.  He was an assistant coach at Lafayette in 1940.   Cavallo later coached at the Perkiomen School in Pennsburg, Pennsylvania and at Ramsey High School in Ramsey, New Jersey before he was hired as an assistant coach at George Washington University in 1949.  He served as the head football coach at Glendale High School in Glendale, Arizona for two seasons, 1953 and 1954, before moving to New Mexico A&M.

Head coaching record

College

References

Year of birth missing
Year of death missing
Lafayette Leopards football coaches
Lafayette Leopards football players
George Washington Colonials football coaches
New Mexico State Aggies football coaches
High school football coaches in Arizona
High school football coaches in New Jersey
High school football coaches in Pennsylvania
Sportspeople from Weymouth, Massachusetts
Players of American football from Massachusetts